Skaidrīte is a Latvian feminine given name. The associated Latvian name day is February 28.

Notable people named Skaidrīte 
 Skaidrīte Smildziņa-Budovska (born 1943), Latvian basketball player

References 

Latvian feminine given names
Feminine given names